René Weller (born 21 November 1953) is a retired German boxer. He competed for West Germany in the men's featherweight event at the 1976 Summer Olympics. At the 1976 Summer Olympics, he defeated Serge Thomas of France, before losing to Gheorghe Ciochina of Romania.  He was also the most probable West German runner-up for the 1980 Summer Olympics, but the West German government decided to join the U.S.-imposed boycott, so Weller missed the event together with the rest of the FRG Olympic squad.

References

External links
 

1953 births
Living people
Featherweight boxers
German male boxers
Olympic boxers of West Germany
Boxers at the 1976 Summer Olympics
Sportspeople from Pforzheim
AIBA World Boxing Championships medalists
20th-century German people